is a 2007 anime film. It is the 15th film based on the popular manga and anime series Crayon Shin-chan.

The film was released in theatres on April 21, 2007, in Japan. It was later released on DVD in Japan on November 23, 2007. This is first time where Shin-chan's pet dog Shiro takes central role in the movie where film depicts touching story of bond between Nohara Family and their dog Shiro where Shin-chan take great length to save his Shiro from various group who are quest to capture it.

Characters
Regular Cast:
Nohara family
 Shin-chan
 A main character. A kindergartener (5 years old).
 Shiro
 The second main character of this movie. A male dog which is kept in the Nohara family.
 Hiroshi
 Father of Shin-chan.
 Mitsy
 Mother of Shin-chan.
 Himawari
 A sister of Shin-chan.

Movie Exclusive Characters:

Tokitsune Shigurein
 Administrator of the UNTI （Unidentified Nature Team Inspection）. A duty of the organization UNTI has monitoring of the space.

Madame Butterfly
Poppies head of the opera.

Kinpa, Ginpa
In the frame of your entourage, an eerie duo with a mask. Use techniques such as airborne and brainwashing. But it can also be seen as manipulating the pieces your wife, was a mysterious character that identity is not known until the end after all.

Urara, Kurara, and Sarara
Three daughters belonging Poppies opera. Sarara Kurara, Urara yellow costume girl, girl girl costume red green costume.

Dandelion
Poppies opera spies had infiltrated the UNTI. Representing the identity opera company when the late corn poppy was infiltrated into the base of UNTI.

Gorilla and hippopotamus
Shigure hospital aides.

Box office
The Motion Pictures Producers Association of Japan has posted the final box office tally of Crayon Shin-chan Movie 15: Arashi wo Yobu Utau Ketsu dake Bakudan! which earned 1.55 billion yen (US$14.5 Million) and ranked as fifth highest grossing anime film of 2007.

See also
 Crayon Shin-chan 
 Yoshito Usui

References

External links
 
 

2007 anime films
Fierceness That Invites Storm! The Singing Buttocks Bomb
Toho animated films
Films set in Okinawa Prefecture